The cusk-eel family, Ophidiidae, is a group of marine bony fishes in the Ophidiiformes order. The scientific name is from the Greek ophis meaning "snake", and refers to their eel-like appearance. True eels, however, diverged from other ray-finned fish during the Jurassic, while cusk-eels are part of the Percomorpha clade, along with tuna, perch, seahorses, and others.

Distribution 
Cusk-eels are found in temperate and tropical oceans throughout the world. They live close to the sea bottom, ranging from shallow water to the hadal zone.

Ecology 
Cusk-eels are generally very solitary in nature, but some species have been seen to associate themselves with tube worm communities. Liking to be hidden when they are not foraging, they generally associate themselves within muddy bottoms, sinkholes, or larger structures that they can hide in or around, such as caves, coral crevices, or communities of bottom-dwelling invertebrates, with some parasitic species of cusk-eel actually living inside of invertebrate hosts, such as oysters, clams, and sea cucumbers. Cusk-eels generally feed nocturnally, preying on invertebrates, crustaceans, and other small bottom-dwelling fishes.

Phylogeny 
Due to the inconsistencies in specific morphological characteristics in closely related species, attempts to use different characters, such as the position of pelvic fins, to classify Ophiididae into distinct families has proven highly unsatisfactory. Overall, Ophidiidae are classified based on whether or not they practice viviparity and the structures they contain that are associated with bearing life.

Characteristics 
Cusk-eels are characterized by a long, slender body that is about 12-13 times as long as it is deep. Their dorsal and anal fins are typically continuous with the caudal fin (with exception to a few species), forming a long, ribbon like fin around the posterior of the cusk-eel’s body. This caudal fin will often be seen to be reduced to a fleshy or bony point, especially when confluent with the dorsal and anal fins. The dorsal fin to anal fin ray ratio is approximately 1.5:1, leading to the dorsal fin typically being longer than the anal. The pectoral fins of cusk-eels are typically longer than the length of their head. Unlike true eels of the order Anguilliformes, cusk-eels have ventral fins that are developed into a forked barbel-like organ below the mouth. In true eels by contrast, the ventral fins are never well-developed and usually missing entirely. Cusk-eels have large mouths relative to their heads, with the upper jaw reaching beyond the eye, and paired nostrils on either side of the head. In cusk-eels, scales are potentially absent, and when present, they are small.

Reproduction 
Unlike their close relatives, the viviparous brotulas of the family Bythitidae, cusk-eel species are egg-bearing, or oviparous, organisms. While the specifics of the eggs of the family Ophidiidae are unknown, they are believed to be either spawned as individual, free-floating eggs in the open water or are placed in a mucilaginous raft, which will float for several days until they hatch into cusk-eel larvae. These larvae live amongst the plankton relatively close to the water's surface and are believed to be able to control their metamorphosis into adult cusk-eels, allowing them to disperse over greater distances into less utilized habitats and reduce competition in concentrated areas.

Conservation status 
While a few species are fished commercially – most notably the pink cusk-eel, Genypterus blacodes – and several species of the order Ophidiiformes are listed as vulnerable, not enough information has been gathered about Ophidiidae as a whole to determine their conservation status.

Genera
The cusk-eel family contains about 240 species, grouped into 50 genera:Subfamily Brotulinae
 Genus Brotula – typical brotulas
Subfamily Brotulotaenilinae
 Genus Brotulotaenia
Subfamily Neobythitinae

 Genus Abyssobrotula
 Genus Acanthonus – boney-eared assfish
 Genus Alcockia
 Genus Apagesoma
 Genus Barathrites
 Genus Barathrodemus
 Genus Bassogigas
 Genus Bassozetus
 Genus Bathyonus
 Genus Benthocometes
 Genus Dannevigia – Australian tusk
 Genus Dicrolene
 Genus Enchelybrotula
 Genus Epetriodus – needletooth cusk
 Genus Eretmichthys
 Genus Glyptophidium
 Genus Holcomycteronus
 Genus Homostolus – filament cusk
 Genus Hoplobrotula
 Genus Hypopleuron – whiptail cusk
 Genus Lamprogrammus
 Genus Leptobrotula
 Genus Leucicorus
 Genus Luciobrotula
 Genus Mastigopterus
 Genus Monomitopus
 Genus Neobythites
 Genus Neobythitoides
 Genus Penopus
 Genus Petrotyx
 Genus Porogadus
 Genus Pycnocraspedum
 Genus Selachophidium – Gunther's cusk-eel
 Genus Sirembo
 Genus Spectrunculus
 Genus Spottobrotula
 Genus Tauredophidium
 Genus Typhlonus
 Genus Ventichthys – East-Pacific ventbrotula
 Genus Xyelacyba

Subfamily Ophidiinae

 Genus Cherublemma – black brotula
 Genus Chilara – spotted cusk-eel
 Genus Genypterus
 Genus Lepophidium
 Genus Menziesichthys
 Genus Ophidion
 Genus Otophidium
 Genus Parophidion
 Genus Raneya – banded cusk-eel

Gallery

References

External links 

 
Taxa named by Constantine Samuel Rafinesque